The Beijing Royal Fighters are a Chinese professional men's basketball team which is based in Beijing and plays in the Northern Division of the Chinese Basketball Association (CBA). Beijing BG (known in Chinese as Beijing Beikong) is the club's corporate sponsor.

History
The franchise was founded in 2009 in Guangzhou and spent its first five seasons of existence competing in the lower levels of China's basketball league system. The team relocated to Chongqing in 2012. The club entered the CBA in the 2014–15 season as an expansion team and finished at the bottom of the league standings with a record of 4–34.

In September 2015, the club relocated again and was initially renamed Beijing BG, but to avoid confusion with the city's association football team, which is also called Beijing BG, as well as to avoid confusion with the Beijing Ducks when only the geographical names of the clubs are used, a large number of Chinese sports websites refer to the team as the Beikong Fly Dragons.

Current roster

Honours
Seri Mutiara Cup champion 2017

References

Chinese Basketball Association teams
Sport in Chongqing
2009 establishments in China
Basketball teams established in 2009